Bojana Bukumirović is a Serbian politician. She was elected to the National Assembly of Serbia in 2022 as a member of the far-right Serbian Party Oathkeepers (Srpska stranka Zavetnici, SSZ) and is also the leader of the party's group in the City Assembly of Belgrade.

Private career
Bukumirović is from the Kaluđerica neighbourhood of the Belgrade municipality of Grocka. She is a graduated economist.

Politician
Bukumirović received the thirteenth position on the SSZ's list in the 2018 Belgrade city assembly election. The list did not cross the electoral threshold to win representation in the assembly.

She was given the twelfth position on the party's list in the 2020 parliamentary election, which also failed to cross the threshold. In the concurrent 2020 Serbian local elections, she appeared in the lead position on the party's list for the Grocka municipal assembly and was elected when the list won a single mandate. She continues to serve in the municipal assembly as of 2022.

Parliamentarian
Bukumirović appeared in the fifth position on the SSZ's list in the 2022 parliamentary election and was elected when the list won ten mandates. The Serbian Progressive Party (Srpska napredna stranka, SNS) and its allies won the election, and the SSZ serves in opposition. Bukumirović is a member of the committee on finance, state budget, and control of public spending; a member of the committee on the rights of the child; a deputy member of the health and family committee and the committee on constitutional and legislative issues; and a member of Serbia's delegation to the parliamentary dimension of the Central European Initiative.

She received the fourth position on the SSZ's list for the Belgrade city assembly in the 2022 city election, which was held concurrently with the parliamentary vote, and was elected when the list won four mandates. As at the republic level, the SNS and its allies won the election, and the SSZ serves in opposition. Bukumirović is now the leader of the party's assembly group.

References

1981 births
Living people
Politicians from Belgrade
21st-century Serbian women politicians
21st-century Serbian politicians
Members of the National Assembly (Serbia)
Members of the City Assembly of Belgrade
Members of the Parliamentary Dimension of the Central European Initiative
Serbian Party Oathkeepers politicians
Women members of the National Assembly (Serbia)